Brisa Beach Party is an electronic dance music event held annually in Praia do Aterro, Matosinhos, Porto in Portugal by the radio station Nova Era radio station. Already performed on stage names like Tiesto, Bob Sinclar, Erick Morillo, Swedish House Mafia, David Guetta, Alesso, Avicii, Swanky Tunes, Martin Solveig, Dimitri Vegas & Like Mike, Nicky Romero, Afrojack, Martin Garrix, Hardwell among other great DJs. It is the biggest beach party in the world.

Events

2007

2008

2009

2010

2011

2012

2013
The festival was held on 6 of July

2014
The festival was held on 6 of July

2015
The festival was held on 3 and 4 of July

2016
The festival was held on 1 and 2 of July

2017

2018

References

External links
 Radio Nova Era

Portugal
Matosinhos
Summer events in Portugal